Plumb is the debut studio album by Christian singer-songwriter Plumb. The album was not only a success for herself, but also for Matt Bronleewe. This was Bronleewe's first role producing.

Track listing
 "Sobering (Don't Turn Around)"
 "Who Am I?"
 "Unforgivable"
 "Endure"
 "Willow Tree"
 "Concrete" featuring Dan Haseltine
 "Crazy"
 "Pennyless"
 "Cure"
 "Send Angels"
 "Pluto" hidden track

Chart performance
 No. 28 Billboard Top Contemporary Christian

References

1997 debut albums
Plumb (singer) albums
Essential Records (Christian) albums